Polymerase (DNA directed) nu is a protein in humans that is encoded by the POLN gene. It is a family A DNA polymerase, considered to be the least effective of the polymerase enzymes. However, DNA polymerase nu plays an active role in homology repair during cellular responses to crosslinks, fulfilling its role in a complex with helicase.

References

Further reading

External links 
 PDBe-KB provides an overview of all the structure information available in the PDB for Human DNA polymerase nu

DNA replication
DNA-binding proteins